Alvania spinosa is a species of minute sea snail, a marine gastropod mollusk or micromollusk in the family Rissoidae.

Description
The length of the shell varies between 1.75 mm and 3.7 mm.

Distribution
This species occurs in the Western Mediterranean Sea.

References

 Gofas, S.; Le Renard, J.; Bouchet, P. (2001). Mollusca, in: Costello, M.J. et al. (Ed.) (2001). European register of marine species: a check-list of the marine species in Europe and a bibliography of guides to their identification. Collection Patrimoines Naturels, 50: pp. 180–213

Rissoidae
Gastropods described in 1890